Archibald is an unincorporated community in Richland Parish, Louisiana, United States.  The ZIP Code for Archibald is 71218.

History
Archibald was named for J. Burton Archibald, who was instrumental in bringing the railroad to the community.

References

Unincorporated communities in Richland Parish, Louisiana
Unincorporated communities in Louisiana